Atletik Kuklen is a Bulgarian football club based in Kuklen, Plovdiv Province, that currently plays in the South-West Third League, the third tier of Bulgarian football. It was founded in 1927. 

The club’s nickname is The Basques of Kuklen, in reference to the Spanish football club Athletic Bilbao, who are from the Basque Country.

Current squad

References 

Atletik Kuklen
Association football clubs established in 1927
1927 establishments in Bulgaria